Carole Anne Goble,  (born 10 April 1961) is a British academic who is Professor of Computer Science at the University of Manchester. She is principal investigator (PI) of the myGrid, BioCatalogue and myExperiment projects and co-leads the Information Management Group (IMG) with Norman Paton.

Education
Goble was educated at Maidstone School for Girls. Her academic career has been spent at the Department of Computer Science where she gained her Bachelor of Science degree in computing and information systems from 1979 to 1982.

Research and career
Her current research interests include Grid computing, the Semantic Grid, the Semantic Web, Ontologies, e-Science, medical informatics, Bioinformatics, and Research Objects. She applies advances in knowledge technologies and workflow systems to solve information management problems for life scientists and other scientific disciplines. She has successfully secured funding from the European Union, the Defense Advanced Research Projects Agency (DARPA) in the United States and UK funding agencies including the Engineering and Physical Sciences Research Council (EPSRC), Biotechnology and Biological Sciences Research Council (BBSRC), Economic and Social Research Council (ESRC), Medical Research Council (United Kingdom) (MRC), the Department of Health, The Open Middleware Infrastructure Institute and the Department of Trade and Industry.

Her work has been published in leading peer reviewed scientific journals including Nucleic Acids Research, Bioinformatics, IEEE Computer, the Journal of Biomedical Semantics, Briefings in Bioinformatics, Artificial Intelligence in Medicine, the Pacific Symposium on Biocomputing conference, the International Journal of Cooperative Information Systems, the Journal of Biomedical Informatics, Nature Genetics and Drug Discovery Today.

Goble joined the University of Manchester in 1985, and was appointed to a chair in 2000. She is an editorial board member of IEEE Internet Computing, GigaScience, and the International Journal of Web Service Research, and served as the editor-in-chief of Elsevier's Journal of Web Semantics from 2003-2008.

Goble serves on several committees, which includes the advisory committees of the Science and Technology Facilities Council Physical and Life Sciences advisory committee; the Netherlands Bioinformatics Centre and the European Grid Infrastructure committee.

She was appointed to the Biotechnology and Biological Sciences Research Council on 13 June 2013.

She has served on the Engineering and Physical Sciences Research Council Technical Opportunities Panel; the Semantic Web Science Association; the British Library's Content Strategy Advisory Board and the Research Councils UK e-Science Steering Committee. She co-founded Cerebra, an early spin-off company to exploit Semantic Web technologies which has been sold.

Awards and honours

Goble was recipient of the first Jim Gray e-Science Award in December 2008. Tony Hey, corporate vice-president of Microsoft External Research who sponsored the award, said Goble was chosen for the award because of her work to help scientists do data-intensive science through the Apache Taverna.

Her work has won best paper awards at the 3rd IEEE International Conference on e-Science and Grid Computing (2007) and the 11th ACM International Conference on Hypertext. In 2002 she was honoured by Sun Microsystems for her significant achievements in advancing Life Science Computing. She has given keynotes in many forums, including international conferences on: Digital curation, e-Social Science, Grid Computing, Intelligent Systems for Molecular Biology, Pacific Symposium on Biocomputing, Hypertext and Hypermedia, Bioinformatics Open Source Conference (BOSC), Artificial intelligence, Systems Biology, Discovery Science, the Semantic Web, International World Wide Web Conference and Medical Informatics.

Goble was appointed Commander of the Order of the British Empire (CBE) in the 2014 New Year Honours for services to science.

She was elected a Fellow of the Royal Academy of Engineering (FREng) in 2010. In January 2018 Goble was awarded the degree of Doctorem (Honoris Causa) by Maastricht University.

References

Alumni of the Victoria University of Manchester
People associated with the Department of Computer Science, University of Manchester
Commanders of the Order of the British Empire
Fellows of the British Computer Society
Fellows of the Royal Academy of Engineering
Female Fellows of the Royal Academy of Engineering
Academics of the University of Manchester
People from Maidstone
Living people
British bioinformaticians
People educated at Maidstone Grammar School for Girls
1961 births
Semantic Web people
British women computer scientists
21st-century women engineers